Alexis Quezada Cardenas (born May 2, 1997) is an American professional soccer player who plays as a midfielder.

Personal life
Quezada was born in Chicago, Illinois, and was raised most of his life in West Chicago. Attending Wegner Elementary School, Leman Middle School and West Chicago Community High School.

Career

W.C United Wildcats
Quezada first participated in his local club soccer team, W.C United Wildcats which stands for West Chicago United Wildcats.

Chicago Fire
After playing a short time with his high school program, Quezada was invited to a tryout with Chicago Fire youth academy in the Major League Soccer. Spending years in the clubs youth academy and developing.

Deportivo Cuenca
In 2014 Quezada transferred to Deportivo Cuenca (youth academy) of the Serie A at just 16 years of age which he mentioned as having an exceptional infrastructure for developing young players in their system. Alexis attracted interest from a number of clubs, and eventually Deportivo Cuenca won the race for his signature in February 2014. Toluca was close in 2013 but passport problems prevented him from playing in Mexico.

Club Venados
On July 6, 2016, Quezada received his Mexican nationality and was joining Mexican side Venados F.C. of Ascenso MX. Not playing much of his time due to injuries on his ankle. He did help Cantera Venados obtain their first championship title in their institution youth system.

Club Celaya
Before the second half of 2017–18, Quezada joined Celaya in the Ascenso MX now called Liga de Expansión MX.

Leixões S.C.
In 2020, it was announced that Quezada signed with Segunda Liga Portugal side Leixões. Debuting against Boavista on December 18, 2021, in Estádio do Bessa. He was also part of Leixões very talented side Liga Revelação under-23 squad who were one victory away of becoming champions before losing against Estoril 2-0. The match was terminated after a massive brawl occurred between both sides with minutes remaining.

AD Fafe
In 2021, he joined Portuguese club side Fafe in Liga 3 (Portugal)

Xanthi F.C.
Alexis was officially signed to historic Greek club side Xanthi. On April 10, 2022, he debuted for Xanthi in a 0–0 draw with Panserraikos in the Super League 2.

International career

Quezada is eligible to represent the United States, Ecuador, and Mexico internationally through birth and ancestry.

References

1997 births
Living people
Soccer players from Chicago
American soccer players
American people of Ecuadorian descent
Sportspeople of Ecuadorian descent
American sportspeople of Mexican descent
American expatriate soccer players
Xanthi F.C. players
Leixões S.C. players
Association football midfielders
Celaya F.C. Premier players
Expatriate footballers in Greece
AD Fafe players
Expatriate footballers in Portugal
Liga Premier de México players
Super League Greece 2 players
Venados F.C. players
American expatriate sportspeople in Ecuador
American expatriate sportspeople in Greece
American expatriate sportspeople in Mexico
American expatriate sportspeople in Portugal